The Red Glove is a 1919 American film serial directed by J. P. McGowan for Universal. The film is considered to be lost.

Cast
 Marie Walcamp as Billie
 Pat O'Malley as Kern Thodes (early chapters)
 Truman Van Dyke as Kern Thodes (later chapters)
 Thomas G. Lingham as Starr Wiley
 Leon De La Mothe as The Vulture
 Alfred Allen as Gentleman Geoff
 Evelyn Selbie as Tiajuana
 William Dyer

Plot
Walcamp played a "fearless cowgirl" engaged in "perilous adventures" in the cliffhanger style. One episode featured a train robbery, and that scene was filmed at the Sierra Railway  on May 26, 1919.

Chapter Titles
 The Pool of Mystery (a.k.a. The Pool of Lost Souls)
 The Claws of The Vulture
 The Vulture's Vengeance
 The Passing of Gentleman Geoff
 At The Mercy of A Monster
 The Flames of Death
 A Desperate Chance
 Facing Death
 A Leap For Life
 Out of Death's Shadow
 Through Fire and Water (a.k.a. In the Depths of The Sea)
 In Death's Grip
 Trapped
 The Lost Millions
 The Mysterious Message
 In Search of A Name (a.k.a. In Deadly Peril)
 The Rope of Death
 Run To Earth

See also
 List of film serials
 List of film serials by studio

References

External links

1919 films
1910s action thriller films
American silent serial films
American black-and-white films
American action thriller films
Films directed by J. P. McGowan
Lost American films
Universal Pictures film serials
1910s American films
Silent thriller films